Arčoni is a settlement that is part of Renče in western Slovenia in the municipality of Renče-Vogrsko.

References

External links
Arčoni on Geopedia

Populated places in the Municipality of Renče-Vogrsko